Ranju Darshana (Nepali:  रन्जु दर्शना) (born as Ranju Neupane on 3 March 1996) is a Nepalese youth activist and politician. She has been active in politics from very young age of seventeen. She became an iconic person after her candidacy for mayor of Kathmandu Metropolitan City in the Nepalese local level election of 2017. Darshana was the central committee member and media coordinator of Bibeksheel Nepali. She was elected as central member by the first general convention of the party in late 2015.

Darshana entered into the politics from activism against Nepal Bandha or conditional national strike. She was active in the rescue activities during the April 2015 Nepal earthquake. She has mobilized youths in peaceful protest against corruption, especially in the medical sector reform drive of Dr. Govinda K.C.

Darshana, who had raised the slogan of "Kathmandu the most beautiful city in the world" for this election drive, secured third position with 23,439 votes. Bidya Sundar Shakya, a candidate from the Communist Party of Nepal (Unified Marxist–Leninist), was elected with 64,913 votes.

Darshana has committed to keep working in the social field to correct the politics of society, even after being defeated in the mayoral election.

Education
Darshana studied in Bhanubhakta Memorial Higher Secondary School and National College Kathmandu.

References

21st-century Nepalese women politicians
21st-century Nepalese politicians
Bibeksheel Nepali politicians
People from Kathmandu
1996 births
Living people